Blessed Robert may refer to:

Robert Nutter (c. 1550–1600), Dominican
Robert Guérin du Rocher (1736–1792), Jesuit

See also
Saint Robert (disambiguation)